Philippe Heberlé (born 21 March 1963) is a French sport shooter and Olympic Champion. He won a gold medal in the 10 metre air rifle event at the 1984 Summer Olympics in Los Angeles and became World Champion twice in 1983 and 1985.

References

1963 births
Living people
French male sport shooters
ISSF rifle shooters
Olympic shooters of France
Olympic gold medalists for France
Shooters at the 1984 Summer Olympics
Olympic medalists in shooting

Medalists at the 1984 Summer Olympics
20th-century French people